Hank Stuever (born 1968) is an American journalist who writes about popular culture for the Style section of The Washington Post.

Early life and education 
Stuever was born and raised in Oklahoma City, where he attended Bishop McGuinness Catholic High School. Stuever earned a Bachelor of Arts degree from Loyola University New Orleans in 1990.

Career 
In 2009, Stuever became the paper's TV critic. He is a two-time finalist for the Pulitzer Prize for Feature Writing, in 1993 and 1996. His book of articles and essays, Off Ramp: Adventures and Heartache in the American Elsewhere, was published in 2004. Entertainment Weekly called Off Ramp "Razor sharp...a master class in top-notch journalism."

In 2009, Stuever released his second book, Tinsel: A Search for America's Christmas Present. It centers on the lives of three different families in Frisco, Texas, during three consecutive Christmas seasons and the impact the holiday has on modern culture and the consumer economy.

Earlier in his career, Stuever was a reporter for The Albuquerque Tribune and the Austin American-Statesman.

Personal life 
Stuever currently resides in Washington, D.C.

See also
 The List: What's In and Out

References

External links

 Stuever's webpage

1968 births
American television critics
American travel writers
American male non-fiction writers
Living people
The Washington Post journalists
20th-century American journalists
American male journalists
21st-century American journalists
20th-century American non-fiction writers
21st-century American non-fiction writers
20th-century American male writers
21st-century American male writers
Writers from Oklahoma City
Journalists from Oklahoma
Loyola University New Orleans alumni